Aliabad (also Romanized as ‘Alīābād) is a village in Rizab Rural District, Qatruyeh District, Neyriz County, Fars Province, Iran. At the 2006 census, its population was 290, in 70 families.

References 

Populated places in Neyriz County